Igor Vladimirovich Akhremchik (18 October 1933 – 1990) was a Russian rower who competed for the Soviet Union in the 1960 Summer Olympics.

He was born in Leningrad.

At the 1960 Summer Olympics, he was a crew member of the Soviet boat that won the bronze medal in the coxless four event. At the 1961 European Rowing Championships, he won silver with the coxless four in Prague.

References

External links
 

1933 births
1990 deaths
Russian male rowers
Soviet male rowers
Olympic rowers of the Soviet Union
Rowers at the 1960 Summer Olympics
Olympic bronze medalists for the Soviet Union
Olympic medalists in rowing
Medalists at the 1960 Summer Olympics
Rowers from Saint Petersburg
European Rowing Championships medalists